Stan Love may refer to:

Stan Love (basketball) (born 1949), American basketball player
Stanley G. Love (born 1965), American astronaut